Qarin may refer to:

 Qareen
 Qarin, Yemen
 House of Karen